Kaprijke is a municipality in the Belgian province of East Flanders. In  2021, Kaprijke had a total population of 6,508.

History
The name Kaprijke comes from Gallo-Roman name "Capricum" which means "Land of Caprius". It used to be the site of a Roman garrison, which can still be seen at the square in front of the old town hall. Kaprijke received city rights in 1240 by Joan, Countess of Flanders.

During the 14th and 15th century, the cloth industry flourished in Kaprijke.  However, during the period of religious strife during the 16th century, the merchants and cloth makers withdrew to safer locations.  Following the resolution of the problems, the merchants and weavers did not return, leading up to the decline of the city of Kaprijke into a rural village during the 17th and 18th centuries.

Kaprijke is known for its beautiful castle built in 1550, Hof ter Kruisen.  It was commissioned by Andries of Baviere and finished in 1628.

In 1976, Kaprijke merged with another town called Lembeke, for a total population of around 6,200 people.

Lembeke is the home of Lotus Bakeries. The Bardelaere Museum is located in Lembeke.

Famous inhabitants
Roger De Vlaeminck, cyclist, amongst other four times winner of Paris–Roubaix
Hippoliet Van Peene (1811–1864), poet and playwright, best known for writing the poem "De Vlaamse Leeuw" which came to be the Flemish anthem.

Gallery

References

External links

Kaprijke (Official website)

Municipalities of East Flanders
Populated places in East Flanders